The National Metal and Machinery Workers' Union (MMU, Kinzokukikai) was a trade union representing workers in small and medium-sized engineering works in Japan.

The union was founded in 1989, when the National Trade Union of Metal and Engineering Workers merged with the National Machinery and Metal Workers' Union.  It affiliated to the Japanese Trade Union Confederation.  On 9 September 1999, it merged with the Japanese Metal Industrial Workers' Union to form JAM.

References

Engineering trade unions
Trade unions established in 1989
Trade unions disestablished in 1999
Trade unions in Japan